In mathematics, Fredholm's theorems are a set of celebrated results of Ivar Fredholm in the Fredholm theory of integral equations. There are several closely related theorems, which may be stated in terms of integral equations, in terms of linear algebra, or in terms of the Fredholm operator on Banach spaces.

The Fredholm alternative is one of the Fredholm theorems.

Linear algebra
Fredholm's theorem in linear algebra is as follows: if M is a matrix, then the orthogonal complement of the row space of M is the null space of M:

Similarly, the orthogonal complement of the column space of M is the null space of the adjoint:

Integral equations
Fredholm's theorem for integral equations is expressed as follows. Let  be an integral kernel, and consider the homogeneous equations

and its complex adjoint

Here, the integral is expressed as a one-dimensional integral on the real number line. In Fredholm theory, this result generalizes to integral operators on multi-dimensional spaces, including, for example, Riemannian manifolds.

Existence of solutions
One of Fredholm's theorems, closely related to the Fredholm alternative, concerns the existence of solutions to the inhomogeneous Fredholm equation

Solutions to this equation exist if and only if the function  is orthogonal to the complete set of solutions  of the corresponding homogeneous adjoint equation:

References
 E.I. Fredholm, "Sur une classe d'equations fonctionnelles", Acta Math., 27  (1903)  pp. 365–390.
 
 

Fredholm theory
Linear algebra
Theorems in functional analysis